{{Infobox settlement
| name                   =  
| image_skyline          =  
| image_caption          = 
| image_flag             = Flag of Sta. Magdalena, Sorsogon.png
| flag_size              = 120x80px
| image_seal             =   
| seal_size              = 100x80px
| image_map              = 
| map_caption            = 
| image_map1             = 
| pushpin_map            = Philippines
| pushpin_label_position = left
| pushpin_map_caption    = Location within the 
| coordinates            = 
| settlement_type        = 
| subdivision_type       = Country
| subdivision_name       = Philippines
| subdivision_type1      = Region
| subdivision_name1      = 
| subdivision_type2      = Province
| subdivision_name2      = 
| official_name          = 
| etymology              = 
| named_for              = 
| native_name            =
| other_name             = Busaingan
| nickname               =
| motto                  =
| anthem                 =
| subdivision_type3      = District
| subdivision_name3      = 
| established_title      = Founded
| established_date       = 
| parts_type             = Barangays
| parts_style            = para
| p1                     =   (see Barangays)
| leader_title           =  
| leader_name            = Eduardo T. Lozano
| leader_title1          = Vice Mayor
| leader_name1           = Ramon R. Espela
| leader_title2          = Representative 
| leader_name2           = Vacant
| leader_title3          = Municipal Council
| leader_name3           = 
| leader_title4          = Electorate 
| leader_name4           =  voters
| government_type        = 
| government_footnotes   = 
| elevation_m            = 
| elevation_max_m        = 630
| elevation_min_m        = 0
| elevation_max_rank     =
| elevation_min_rank     =
| elevation_footnotes    = 
| elevation_max_footnotes= 
| elevation_min_footnotes= 
| area_rank              =
| area_footnotes         = 
| area_total_km2         = 
| population_footnotes   = 
| population_total       = 
| population_as_of       = 
| population_density_km2 = auto
| population_blank1_title= Households
| population_blank1      =  
| population_blank2_title= 
| population_blank2      = 
| population_demonym     =
| population_rank        =
| population_note        =
| timezone               = PST
| utc_offset             = +8
| postal_code_type       = ZIP code
| postal_code            = 
| postal2_code_type      = 
| postal2_code           = 
| area_code_type         = 
| area_code              = 
| website                = 
| demographics_type1     = Economy
| demographics1_title1   = 
| demographics1_info1    = 
| demographics1_title2   = Poverty incidence
| demographics1_info2    = %
| demographics1_title3   = Revenue
| demographics1_info3    =   
| demographics1_title4   = Revenue rank
| demographics1_info4    = 
| demographics1_title5   = Assets
| demographics1_info5    =   
| demographics1_title6   = Assets rank
| demographics1_info6    = 
| demographics1_title7   = IRA
| demographics1_info7    =  
| demographics1_title8   = IRA rank
| demographics1_info8    = 
| demographics1_title9   = Expenditure
| demographics1_info9    =   
| demographics1_title10  = Liabilities
| demographics1_info10   =  
| demographics_type2     = Service provider 
| demographics2_title1   = Electricity
| demographics2_info1    = 
| demographics2_title2   = Water
| demographics2_info2    =  
| demographics2_title3   = Telecommunications
| demographics2_info3    = 
| demographics2_title4   = Cable TV
| demographics2_info4    =
| demographics2_title5   = 
| demographics2_info5    =
| demographics2_title6   = 
| demographics2_info6    =
| demographics2_title7   = 
| demographics2_info7    =
| demographics2_title8   = 
| demographics2_info8    =
| demographics2_title9   = 
| demographics2_info9    =
| demographics2_title10  = 
| demographics2_info10   =
| blank_name_sec1        = 
| blank_info_sec1        = 
| blank1_name_sec1       = Native languages
| blank1_info_sec1       = 
| blank2_name_sec1       = Crime index
| blank2_info_sec1       = 
| blank3_name_sec1       = 
| blank3_info_sec1       = 
| blank4_name_sec1       = 
| blank4_info_sec1       = 
| blank5_name_sec1       = 
| blank5_info_sec1       = 
| blank6_name_sec1       = 
| blank6_info_sec1       = 
| blank7_name_sec1       = 
| blank7_info_sec1       = 
| blank1_name_sec2       = Major religions
| blank1_info_sec2       = 
| blank2_name_sec2       = Feast date
| blank2_info_sec2       = 
| blank3_name_sec2       = Catholic diocese
| blank3_info_sec2       =
| blank4_name_sec2       = Patron saint 
| blank4_info_sec2       = 
| blank5_name_sec2       = 
| blank5_info_sec2       = 
| blank6_name_sec2       = 
| blank6_info_sec2       = 
| blank7_name_sec2       = 
| blank7_info_sec2       =
| short_description      =
| footnotes              =
}}
Santa Magdalena, officially the Municipality of Santa Magdalena (Waray Sorsogon: Bungto san Santa Magdalena'';), is a 5th class municipality in the province of Sorsogon, Philippines. According to the 2020 census, it has a population of 17,096 people.

History
On April 15, 2001, former three-term mayor Felix Frayna was running against incumbent mayor Nida Gamos when he was assassinated by two suspected communist rebels in Barangay San Eugenio while giving a speech on a make-shift platform.

Geography
It is bounded by Bulusan, Matnog and Irosin. It is the smallest municipality in the province, both in population and area. The territorial jurisdiction of the municipality comprises some 4706.443 hectares of land mass and areas of sea territory. 

The local government unit is politically subdivided into 14 barangays, dispersed geographically in the lowlands of Poblacion (4 barangays) and upland (10 barangays). It has 13 coastal barangays and 1 inland barangay (La Ezperansa).

Barangays
Santa Magdalena is politically subdivided into 14 barangays.
San Francisco (Barangay I Poblacion)
Mother of Perpetual (Barangay II Poblacion)
Del Rosario (Barangay III Poblacion)
Santo Niño (Barangay IV Poblacion)
La Esperanza (Manangkas)
Peñafrancia (Uson)
Salvacion (Taverna)
San Antonio (Kaburihan)
San Bartolome (Talaongan)
San Eugenio (Alig-igan)
San Isidro (Bilaoyon)
San Rafael (Bil-og)
San Roque (Alambre)
San Sebastian (Bigo)

Climate

Demographics

Economy

Education
Santa Magdalena Central School - Located in Barangay 3 Poblacion
Santa Magdalena National High School - Located in Barangay 4 Poblacion
Talaonga National High School - Located in San Bartolome

See also
Gallanosa family

References

External links
Santa Magdalena Profile at PhilAtlas.com
[ Philippine Standard Geographic Code]
Philippine Census Information
Local Governance Performance Management System

Municipalities of Sorsogon